The 1980 ECAC Metro men's basketball tournament was held February 28 – March 1. The quarterfinal and championship rounds were played at Nassau Coliseum in Uniondale, New York.

Jim Valvano’s Iona Gaels defeated  in the championship game, 64–46, to win their second ECAC Metro men's basketball tournament in as many years. The Gaels earned a bid to the 1980 NCAA Tournament as No. 6 seed in the East region and advanced to the round of 32.

Bracket

Notes

Conference did not play a formal schedule

References

1979–80 ECAC Metro men's basketball season

ECAC Metro men's basketball tournament